North Dum Dum (also known as Uttar Dumdum) is a city and a municipality of North 24 Parganas district in the Indian state of West Bengal. It is a part of the area covered by Kolkata Metropolitan Development Authority (KMDA). Kolkata Airport is located nearby.

History
North Dumdum Municipality, established in 1870, comprised villages known as Birati, Nimta, Kadihati, Jangalpur Patna, Gouripur and a large area of what is now Netaji Subhas Chandra Bose International Airport. In 1998, Bisharpara gram panchayat and half of Sultanpur gram panchayat were merged with the Municipality.

With the partition of Bengal in 1947, "millions of refugees poured in from erstwhile East Pakistan." In the initial stages bulk of the refugees were non-agriculturists. A few of them made their own arrangements, but "it was squatters who made the East Bengali refugees famous or infamous." Squatting (jabardakhal in Bengali) ranged from the forcible occupation of barracks to the collective take-over of private, government and waste land. By 1949, there were 65 refugee colonies in the Dum Dum and Panihati zone. The squatters were in a way “self-settlers” in the absence of adequate official arrangements for rehabilitation. Within a very short time the refugees (quite often with government/ administrative support) not only found a place to stay but developed a society with markets, schools, temples and sometimes even colleges, hospitals and recreational centres.

Geography

Location

North Dumdum is bounded by Panihati (Municipality), Teghari, Muragachha, Chandpur (all three census towns in Barrackpore II CD Block) and New Barrackpore (Municipality) on the north, Madhyamgram (Municipality) and Bidhannagar Municipal Corporation area on the east, Dum Dum (Municipality) and South Dumdum (Municipality) on the south and Kamarhati (Municipality) on the west. Although not spelled out explicitly such localities as Nimta, Birati and Durganagar are neighbourhoods in North Dumdum Municipal area. In this Google map , published in the website of North Dumdum Municipality, the outline of the limits of the Municipal area is shown. On expanding the map, one can view the neighbourhoods and other location in North Dumdum Municipality.

96% of the population of Barrackpore subdivision (partly presented in the map alongside, all places marked on the map are linked in the full screen map) lives in urban areas. In 2011, it had a density of population of 10,967 per km2 The subdivision has 16 municipalities and 24 census towns.

For most of the cities/ towns information regarding density of population is available in the Infobox. Population data is not available for neighbourhoods. It is available for the entire municipal area and thereafter ward-wise.

Police station
Nimta police station under Barrackpore Police Commissionerate has jurisdiction over North Dumdum Municipal area. Airport police station and Netaji Subhas Chandra Bose International Airport police station partly covers an area shown in census maps as part of North Dumdum Municipality, have been placed under Bidhannagar Police Commissionerate from 2012, along with the entire airport and neighbourhoods through which VIP Road (Kazi Nazrul Islam Sarani) passes.

Post Offices
North Dum Dum is a vast locality with many Postal Index Numbers:

Nimta has a delivery sub post office, with PIN 700049 in the North Presidency Division of North 24 Parganas district in Calcutta region. The only other post offices with the same PIN is Udaipur.

Nilachal has a delivery sub post office, with PIN 700134 in the North Presidency Division of North 24 Parganas district in Calcutta region.

Birati has a delivery sub post office, with PIN 700051 in the North Presidency Division of North 24 Parganas district in Calcutta region. The only other post offices with the same PIN is Sultanpur.

Kolkata Airport has a non-delivery sub post office, with PIN 700052 in the Kolkata North Division of Kolkata district in Calcutta region. The only other post office with the same PIN is Kendriya Vihar.

Durganagar has a non-delivery sub post office, with PIN 700065 in the Kolkata North Division of Kolkata district in Calcutta region.

Demographics

Population

As per the 2011 Census of India, North Dum Dum had a total population of 249,142, of which 126,279 (51%) were males and 122,863 (49%) were females. Population below 6 years was 18,411. The total number of literates in New Barrackpore was 209,964 (91.00% of the population over 6 years).

 India census, North Dumdum had a population of 220,032. Males constitute 51% of the population and females 49%. North Dumdum has an average literacy rate of 82%, higher than the national average of 59.5%: male literacy is 86%, and female literacy is 79%. In North Dumdum, 9% of the population is under 6 years .

Kolkata Urban Agglomeration
The following Municipalities, Census Towns and other locations in Barrackpore subdivision were part of Kolkata Urban Agglomeration in the 2011 census: Kanchrapara (M), Jetia (CT), Halisahar (M), Balibhara (CT), Naihati (M), Bhatpara (M), Kaugachhi (CT), Garshyamnagar (CT), Garulia (M), Ichhapur Defence Estate (CT), North Barrackpur (M), Barrackpur Cantonment (CB), Barrackpore (M), Jafarpur (CT), Ruiya (CT), Titagarh (M), Khardaha (M), Bandipur (CT), Panihati (M), Muragachha (CT) New Barrackpore (M), Chandpur (CT), Talbandha (CT), Patulia (CT), Kamarhati (M), Baranagar (M), South Dumdum (M), North Dumdum (M), Dum Dum (M), Noapara (CT), Babanpur (CT), Teghari (CT), Nanna (OG), Chakla (OG), Srotribati (OG) and Panpur (OG).

Economy

KMDA
North Dumdum municipality is included in the Kolkata Metropolitan Area for which the KMDA is the statutory planning and development authority.

Education
The following institutions are located in Dum Dum:

 Mrinalini Datta Mahavidyapith was established by Birati Shiksha Sansad at Birati in 1964. It offers honours courses in Bengali, English, Sanskrit, history, political science, philosophy, education, sociology, geography, journalism & mass communication, economics, anthropology, physics, mathematics, computer science, botany, zoology, accountancy and BBA. It also offers general courses in arts, science and commerce, and post graduation in Bengali. It caters to the needs of 18,000 students from Birati and the surrounding areas.
 Uttar Dum Dum Vidyapith for Boys, Girls up to class twelve and Primary Section up to class fourth standard. These were also established by Birati Siksha Samsad in 1954.
 Birati Vidyalay for Boys and Girls.
 Birati High School is a boys-only higher secondary school. Being one of the earliest boys schools in North Dum Dum, it has a very spacious campus facilitating the various academic needs of the science and commerce students. The school has a big library, computer room, chemistry, physics, biology labs and a huge playground for various sports activities.
 Nimta High School at Nimta is a boys-only higher secondary school. It was established in 1875.
 Shyamaprasad Nagar High School at Nimta is a co-educational higher secondary school."
 Nimta Jibantosh Memorial Girls High School is a girls-only, higher secondary school.
 Nimta Ishan Chandra Balika Vidyalaya is a girls-only high school.
 Rishi Aurobindo Memorial Academy at P.K.Guha Road (near Airport Gate No. 1), is an English-medium co-educational ICSE school.
 St. Stephen’s School, at R.B.C. Road, is a co-educational English-medium school, that has produced toppers in both ICSE and ISC examination. Managed by the Barracpore Diocesan Education Society, it was established in 1971. It is the main school with 18 branches.
 Indira Gandhi Memorial High School, at P.K.Guha Road, is an English-medium coeducational school affiliated to the CBSE. It was established in 1996 and has facilities for teaching in Classes Nursery to XII.
 Birati Mahajati Vidyamandir For Boys' (H.S.). It is located at Mahajati Nagar in Birati. Near Punjab & Sind Bank. It is established in 1968 .
 Birati Mahajati Balika Vidyamandir (H.S.). It is located at Mahajati Nagar in Birati. It is the beside of Birati Mahajati Vidyamandir.
 " Rajanikanta Shiksha Sadan ".This is Primary School upto class IV. It is situated at Nabanagar, Birati .

Infrastructure
Amongst the civic amenities it had both open and closed drains. Amongst the educational facilities It had 56 primary schools and 18 secondary schools. Amongst the social, recreational and cultural facilities it had 1 auditorium/ community hall and 3 public libraries. It had 9 bank branches.

References

Cities and towns in North 24 Parganas district
Neighbourhoods in Kolkata
Kolkata Metropolitan Area
Cities in West Bengal